The British naturalist Charles Darwin corresponded with his extended family and with an extraordinarily wide range of people from all over the world. The letters, over 15,000 in all,  provide many insights on issues ranging from the origins of key scientific concepts, to religious and philosophical discussions which have continued to the present day. The letters also illuminate many aspects of Darwin and his biography: the development of his ideas; insights into character and health; and private opinions on controversial issues. His letters to the Harvard botanist Asa Gray, for example, show his opinions on slavery and the American Civil War. Darwin relied upon correspondence for much of his scientific work, and also used letters to marshal support for his ideas amongst friends and colleagues. The historian of science Janet Browne has argued that Darwin's ability to correspond daily played a crucial role in the development of his theory and his ability to garner support for it from colleagues.

History 
Correspondence was central to science in the Victorian era. In his early years, most of the letters Darwin filed away were directly relevant to one of his ongoing scientific projects in geology, invertebrate zoology, and other fields. Most letters, however, were stuck onto "spits", as Darwin called them, and when his slender stock of these was exhausted, he would burn the letters of several years, in order that he might make use of the liberated "spits."  This process, carried on for years, destroyed many of the letters received before 1861. Even so, the number of letters, even in these early years, is remarkable. After publication of the Origin of Species in 1859, Darwin's children convinced him to save a far greater proportion of his correspondence, so that the sequence from the early 1860s onwards is remarkably full. 

In 1887, five years after Darwin's death, Darwin's son Francis Darwin published The Life and Letters of Charles Darwin in three volumes, to accompany the publication of The Autobiography of Charles Darwin. This was later followed by two volumes of More Letters of Charles Darwin published in 1902. For over a century these volumes were the main source for Darwin's correspondence, although they contain only a small proportion of the available total, and many are abridged.

In 1974 the Darwin Correspondence Project was founded at Cambridge University by the American philosopher and academic administrator Frederick Burkhardt, with the aid of the Cambridge zoologist and historian Sydney Smith. Cambridge University owns 9,000 letters and has obtained copies of over 6,000 additional letters held in other collections. New letters are being discovered at around 60 per year and photocopies of new finds should be sent to the project, which can help identify correspondents and provide accurate dating. Volumes of the correspondence appear at regular intervals from Cambridge University Press, with the content freely available online after four years. Every volume includes a substantial introduction, and the letters are edited to the highest editorial standard. The Darwin Correspondence website also includes extensive additional materials, including resources for school and university teaching.

The Darwin Correspondence is among the most substantial editing projects in the English-speaking world, with a full- and part-time staff of eleven.

List of notable persons with whom Darwin corresponded 
Entries marked with asterisks denote persons for which 100 letters or more have been located. All of these letters can be found on the Darwin Correspondence Project website.

 Louis Agassiz
 Alexander Bain
 Henry Walter Bates
 Lydia Becker
 George Bentham
 Charles Harrison Blackley
 Antoinette Brown Blackwell
 Mary Boole
 Heinrich Georg Bronn
 John Burdon-Sanderson
 Alphonse Louis Pierre Pyrame de Candolle
 William Benjamin Carpenter
 Frances Power Cobbe
 Walter Drawbridge Crick, grandfather of Francis Crick
 Thomas Davidson
 Anton Dohrn
 Franciscus Donders
 George Eliot
 Hugh Falconer
 Frederic William Farrar
 Thomas Farrer, 1st Baron Farrer
 John Fiske
 Robert FitzRoy
 Auguste-Henri Forel
 Johan Georg Forchhammer
 Francis Galton*

 Jean Albert Gaudry
 James Geikie
 Joseph Henry Gilbert
 Asa Gray*
 William Robert Grove
 Julius von Haast
 Ernst Haeckel
 John Stevens Henslow*
 Joseph Dalton Hooker*
 Thomas Henry Huxley*
 Thomas Jamieson
 Leonard Jenyns
 Charles Kingsley
 Ray Lankester
 John Lubbock*
 Charles Lyell*
 Maxwell T. Masters
 Patrick Matthew
 Charles Johnson Maynard
 Edward S. Morse

 Henry Nottidge Moseley
 Fritz Müller
 John Murray
 Melchior Neumayr
 Alfred Newton
 Richard Owen
 Jean Louis Armand de Quatrefages de Bréau
 George Croom Robertson
 George Romanes
 Sir John Sebright
 Adam Sedgwick
 Frederick Smith
 Herbert Spencer
 Japetus Steenstrup
 Bartholomew Sulivan
 Mary Lua Adelia Davis Treat
 Alfred Russel Wallace
 Julia Wedgwood
 August Weismann
 William Whewell
 William Winwood Reade
 Chauncey Wright

References 
Browne, Janet, Charles Darwin: Voyaging. Princeton, 1995.
 Browne, Janet, Charles Darwin: The Power of Place. Princeton, 2002.

Darwin Correspondence Project website 
Darwin Correspondence Project Home Page, University Library, Cambridge. (Accessed 2009-05-07)

Darwin Correspondence Project publications 
 Volume 1: 1821–1836 (pub 1985) 
 Volume 2: 1837–1843 (pub 1986) 
 Volume 3: 1844–1846 (pub 1987) 
 Volume 4: 1847–1850 (pub 1988) 
 Volume 5: 1851–1855 (pub 1989) 
 Volume 6: 1856–1857 (pub 1990) 
 Volume 7: 1858–1859 (pub 1991) 
 Volume 8: 1860 (pub 1993) 
 Volume 9: 1861 (pub 1994) 
 Volume 10: 1862 (pub 1997) 
 Volume 11: 1863 (pub 1999) 
 Volume 12: 1864 (pub 2001) 
 Volume 13: 1865 (pub 2003) 
 Volume 14: 1866 (pub 2004) 
 Volume 15: 1867 (pub 2005) 
 Volume 16 pt i: 1868 (pub 2008) 
 Volume 16 pt ii: 1868 (pub 2008) 
 Volume 17: 1869 (pub 2009) 
 Volume 18: 1870 and supplement (pub 2010) 
 Volume 19: 1871 (pub 2012) 
 Volume 20: 1872 (pub 2013) 
 Volume 21: 1873 (pub 2014) 
 Volume 22: 1874 (pub 2015) 
 Volume 23: 1875 (pub 2015) 
 Volume 24: 1876 (pub 2016) 
 Volume 25: 1877 (pub 2017) 
 Volume 26: 1878 (pub 2018) 
 Volume 27: 1879 (pub 2019) 
 Further volumes will appear regularly (to 30 volumes in total), with completion of the edition in 2022.

Selections of letters published by the Correspondence Project include:

 Origins: Charles Darwin's Selected Letters, 1825–1859 
 Evolution: Charles Darwin's Selected Letters, 1860–1870 
 Charles Darwin: The Beagle Letters  (all the letters to and from Darwin during the voyage)
 The Correspondence 1821–60: Anniversary Paperback Set 
 Darwin and Women: A Selection of Letters

Early editions of Darwin's letters 

Letters on Geology The Complete Work of Charles Darwin Online
Life and Letters and Autobiography The Complete Work of Charles Darwin Online
More Letters The Complete Work of Charles Darwin Online
Letter on Vivisection The Complete Work of Charles Darwin Online
Charles Darwin Letters Two collections of letters written to and by Charles Darwin

References

Darwin
Works by Charles Darwin